Plugg is a 1975 Australian sex comedy about a private investigator.

Plot
Private detective Plugg is hired to watch a suspect escort agency. Inspector Closer comes after Plugg.

Cast
Peter Thompson as Horatio Plugg
Norman Yemm as Inspector Closer
Cheryl Rixon as Kelli Kelly
Reg Gorman as Constable Hector
Joseph Furst as Judge Fraudenheist

Production
The film was shot in Perth and had a brief run in the cinemas of that city but not in many other areas.

Home media

DVD & streaming releases

References

External links
Plugg at IMDb
Plugg at Oz Movies

Australian sex comedy films
1970s English-language films
Films directed by Terry Bourke
1975 films
1970s Australian films